is a junction that connects the Tōmei Expressway and the Ken-Ō Expressway in the town of Ebina, Kanagawa Prefecture, Japan. Initially, it was tentatively called , but the official name was announced on May 18, 2009. It is located near Shake Station on the Sagami Line.

References 

Roads in Kanagawa Prefecture
Road junctions in Japan
Ebina, Kanagawa